Semen Kolobayev (born 22 August 1976) is a Russian luger who has competed in the late 1990s. He won a bronze medal in the men's doubles event at the 1996 FIL European Luge Championships in Sigulda, Latvia. He also competed in the men's doubles event at the 1998 Winter Olympics.

References

External links
List of European luge champions 
 

Living people
Russian male lugers
1976 births
Lugers at the 1998 Winter Olympics
Olympic lugers of Russia